Strabena smithii is a butterfly in the family Nymphalidae. It is found on Madagascar. The habitat consists of forest and forest margins.

References

Strabena
Butterflies described in 1877
Endemic fauna of Madagascar
Butterflies of Africa
Taxa named by Paul Mabille